Gillespies Beach is a black sand beach and settlement on the West Coast of New Zealand's South Island,  west of Fox Glacier township by road. It is bounded by Westland Tai Poutini National Park to the east, and the Tasman Sea to the west.

During the West Coast Gold Rush, gold was found here in the black sands by a prospector called Gillespie in April 1866. As a result, Gillespies Beach soon had a population of 650, and boasted two butcheries, two bakeries and 11 stores. A cemetery containing the graves of some of the miners remains. During the 20th century, gold dredges worked the sand dunes. A rusting dredge from the 1930s and a seal colony can both be seen a short walk north from the settlement.

References

Westland District
Populated places in the West Coast, New Zealand